Seydou Koné (born 26 December 1987) is an Ivorian professional footballer who has played in Thai League 3 in Thailand.

Honours
Thai League 3
  Runners-up : 2021–22

Thai League 3 Southern Region
  Winners : 2021–22

References

Thaisoccernet 

Expatriate footballers in Thailand
Living people
Ivorian expatriate footballers
Ivorian footballers
1987 births
Ivorian expatriate sportspeople in Thailand
Association football central defenders
Seydou Kone
Seydou Kone
Seydou Kone